A. N. Tiwari is the  former Chief Information Commissioner of India.

References

Year of birth missing (living people)
Living people
Indian Administrative Service officers
Indian government officials